Paradesi may refer to:
 Paradesi (1953 film), a 1953 Telugu-Tamil Bilingual film directed by L. V. Prasad, starring Anjali Devi and Sivaji Ganesan
 Paradesi (1998 film), a 1998 Telugu film directed by K. Raghavendra Rao
 Paradesi (2007 film), a 2007 Indian Malayalam film directed by P. T. Kunju Muhammed and starring Mohanlal
 Paradesi (2013 film), a 2013 Tamil film directed by Bala starring Adharvaa
 Paradesi Jews, a community of Sephardic Jews settled among the larger Cochin Jewish community in Kerala

See also
 Pardesi (disambiguation)
 Pardes (disambiguation)